Mário Leonel Faria Borges de Palma (born 27 June 1950) is a Portuguese basketball coach.

Career
Palma was the coach of Angola at their first appearance at the FIBA Africa Championship, in 1980, finishing in seventh place.

He later would be the coach of Benfica, leading the Portuguese squad to a golden era, where they won five titles at the Portuguese Championship and the Cup of Portugal. They also reached the final group of the European Champions Cup for the first time in 1993/94.

Palma returned to the Angolan squad, where he won three titles in a row at the FIBA Africa Championship editions of 1999, 2001 and 2003. He was also the Angolan coach at the 2000 Summer Olympics and 2004 Summer Olympics.

After leaving the Angola side, he went to coach Clube Desportivo Primeiro de Agosto, where he won the national championship title, and Palma Aqua Mágica, in Spain.  In his most recent position, he led the Jordan national basketball team to the bronze medal at the FIBA Asia Championship 2009, earning the nation its first FIBA World Championship berth.

In March 2011, he was nominated head coach of Portugal.

On 3 May 2021 Palma was appointed head coach of Egyptian club Al Ahly for the remainder of the season.

See also 
 List of FIBA AfroBasket winning head coaches

References

External links
 

1950 births
Living people
Portuguese basketball coaches
Portuguese expatriates in Angola
Bissau-Guinean people of Portuguese descent
S.L. Benfica basketball coaches
Al Ahly basketball coaches
Club Africain basketball coaches

Portuguese people of Bissau-Guinean descent